Ərəbşalbaş (also, Arabshalbash) is a village and the most populous municipality in the Gobustan Rayon of Azerbaijan.  It has a population of 3,708.

References 

Populated places in Gobustan District